Ramalina polymorpha (commonly known as the granular bush lichen) is a strap lichen species. It regularly occurs in both Canada and the United States. The oxidative and cytogenetic effects of R. polymorpha water extract when introduced into human blood cells has been studied for potential use in the pharmaceutical industry or as a dietary supplement.

References

polymorpha
Fungi of Canada
Fungi of the United States
Lichen species
Lichens described in 1792
Fungi without expected TNC conservation status